Magasin för konst, nyheter och moder (meaning Magazine for Art, News and Fashion in English) was an illustrated Swedish fashion magazine, published between 1823 and 1844 by Fredrik Boije. It is recognized to be the first true fashion magazine in Sweden. It was also among the first fashion magazines outside France. The magazine was published monthly.

References

1823 establishments in Sweden
1844 disestablishments in Sweden
Defunct magazines published in Sweden
Fashion magazines
Magazines established in 1823
Magazines disestablished in 1844
Swedish-language magazines
Monthly magazines published in Sweden